East India Company is a general term, referring to a number of European trading companies established in the early modern era to establish trade relations and subsequently political control over the Indian subcontinent, the Indonesian archipelago and the neighboring lands in Southeast Asia. They would include:

 British East India Company (1600–1874)
 Dutch East India Company (1602–1799)
 Danish East India Company (1616–1650), re-established (1670–1729)
 Portuguese East India Company (1628–1633)
 Genoese East India Company (1649–1650)
 French East India Company (1664–1769), re-established (1785–1794)
 Swedish East India Company (1731–1813)
 Austrian East India Company (1776–1781)

Other uses
 East India Company (video game)
 The East India Company, a retail business founded by Sanjiv Mehta in 2010

See also
 West India Company (disambiguation)
 East India Company College
 East India (disambiguation)
 Colonial India
 Christianity in India
 Christianity in Indonesia